Owen Danoff (born November 3, 1989) is an American singer-songwriter from Washington, D.C. He was a contestant on season 10 of NBC's The Voice where he reached the top 11.

Life and career 
Owen Danoff was exposed to music from an early age. His father is Grammy award winner Bill Danoff, a songwriter and original member of the Starland Vocal Band. As a child, he was immersed in his family's musical culture and can recall joining his father onstage at shows. At the age of 15, Danoff wrote and self-produced his first original song using an audio recorder given to him that same day. He attended Gonzaga College High School in Washington, D.C. After high school, Danoff studied at Berklee College of Music in Boston, graduating with a degree in film scoring.

Owen Danoff returned to the D.C. music scene after college, performing at venues such as the Birchmere, the Kennedy Center and the 9:30 Club. In 2012, he released an EP titled ‘Never Trust a Man’. Following the EP release, Danoff was an artist in residence at Strathmore's Institute for Artistic and Professional Development from 2012 to 2013.  During that time, he ran a successful Kickstarter campaign to help fund his full-length debut album. He released ‘Twelve Stories’ in May 2014. The album is a collection of his original music and led Danoff to three Washington Area Music Awards (Wammies) wins. The awards were for best Pop/Rock Recording, Pop/Rock Instrumentalist, and Pop/Rock Vocalist. In 2014, he also released a single titled "Never Been Kissed".

In 2015, Danoff released a single titled "No Such Thing (As You and Me)". For this song, American Songwriter awarded him 1st place in their March/April 2015 lyric contest. After a successful stint on NBC's The Voice where he reached the top 11, Danoff released his latest single titled "Love on Your Side" on July 8, 2016. This song is also the title track on his latest EP, which was released on September 23, 2016. The ‘Love on Your Side’ EP was funded with the help of a successful PledgeMusic campaign, and consists of six original tracks. In addition to his own 2016 releases, Danoff was also credited as a co-songwriter on Nashville star Charles Esten's single "Already Gone Away".

The Voice Season 10
Owen Danoff was a contestant on season 10 of NBC's The Voice, where he finished in 11th place. He was one of the few performers that season to achieve a chair-turn by all four judges. He chose Adam Levine as his coach.

 – Studio version of performance reached the top 10 on iTunes

 The studio version of this performance reached No. 28 on iTunes.
 The studio version of this performance reached No. 53 on iTunes.

Discography

Studio albums

Extended plays

Digital singles

Further reading
 Carissa DiMargo (March 10, 2016). "DC Native Wows on 'The Voice' Audition, Earns 4-Chair Turn". NBC Washington. Retrieved June 12, 2016.
 George Back (March 16, 2016). "Jesse Eisenberg Revealed His Roommate Is a Contestant on ‘The Voice’".  Yahoo! TV. Retrieved June 12, 2016.
 Shubhang Saurav (May 5, 2016). "Last Note: ‘It’s important to chase your dreams,’". International Business Times. Retrieved June 12, 2016.
 Tyler McCarthy (April 28, 2016). "’The Voice’ Season 10 Contestant Owen Danoff On His Final Performance And His New Music". International Business Times. Retrieved June 12, 2016.

References

External links
 Official Owen Danoff website

1989 births
Living people
People from Washington, D.C.
Gonzaga College High School alumni
Berklee College of Music alumni
The Voice (franchise) contestants